Payment on Demand is a 1951 American drama film directed by Curtis Bernhardt and starring Bette Davis and Barry Sullivan. The screenplay by Bernhardt and Bruce Manning chronicles a marriage from its idealistic early days to its dissolution.

Plot

In the opening scenes we meet San Francisco socialite Joyce Ramsey, her daughter Dee; Dee’s fiancée, a banker; Joyce’s husband, David; their daughter, Martha, a college student; Martha’s outspoken boyfriend, Phil Polanski, who is working his way through college to become an agricultural chemist. Joyce is concerned about Phil’s working-class background: His family is Czech and his father works as a taxi starter at the Union Terminal. Joyce is clearly accustomed to managing everything around her in order to maintain the position, family and success that she and David set out to achieve. David is preoccupied and unhappy, and while he is dressing for dinner, he suddenly asks for a divorce, which stuns her. He tells her he is leaving that night, prompting her to look back on their marriage.

Via a flashback, we learn about the couple's humble beginnings in farming country and discover how they worked their way into the world of the nouveau riche. David is a Santa Rosa attorney with no clients, working on construction jobs with his law partner, Bob Townsend. David's wife Joyce serves as the struggling firm's secretary. Finding herself pregnant, she schemes to land a new client, Swanson, a former factory worker with a valuable steel-making patent. She succeeds at getting him to hire David alone.  After the baby is born, Bob is planning to quit and work in a law office. Swanson comes by the apartment with instructions for David and the truth comes out. Bob is very angry and quits.  David is furious with his wife, but she placates him by convincing him her sole intent was to help him and their child, to give them hope. He promises he’ll find a way to make it up to Bob.

Back in the present, Joyce is forced to admit to her daughters their father has left her when a society columnist calls to question his move. She goes out to a luncheon engagement, leaving the stunned girls to wonder why their parents’ marriage is in trouble. At lunch, she learns from her friends that David has been seen with another woman and goes to a lawyer, Mr. Prescott. Through him, she hires a private detective to investigate. The attorney warns her not to talk about her suspicions to anyone.

Another flashback, and David is taking her to the hospital for the birth of their second child. David, now an executive in Swanson's company, announces he has been transferred to San Francisco but wants to buy a little farm within driving distance. Joyce, longing for the excitement of city living and eager for her children to have the benefits of living among people who are doing big things, changes his mind. Eventually she meets Emily Hedges, and the two, bonded by their social-climbing aspirations, become close friends.

An additional flashback which occurs in the more recent past reveals Robert Townsend, in desperate need of $15,000, arriving at the Ramsey home to request a loan. He had refused David’s offers of help for 20 years, but needs him now. Joyce tells him David is away on business and won’t be back for 10 days; she is unable to help him. Her husband learns of her lie and comes to his former partner's aid; she is furious. He accuses Joyce of being callous and breaks off the conversation “before I tell you the truth about yourself.”

A return to the present, where David and girl friend Eileen Benson, alone in her apartment, are photographed through a window by the detective Joyce hired. He asks Eileen to marry him, to save her reputation, but she says no. During a divorce settlement a few days later, Joyce insists that David fund a joint trust or separate trusts for both their daughters, rejecting the idea that Dee’s marriage will provide security for her. She refuses David’s bonded guarantee of what we would call child-support payments; they must become part of the trust(s). She also rejects David’s offer of half of everything he owns, in addition to their home, all her personal possessions and jewelry, which are not included in the settlement. Both lawyers are shocked—David is offering more than any court would award to her. She asks the lawyers to leave them alone. She proceeds to demand all of David's assets, threatening to sue him, naming Eileen as correspondent and revealing their infidelity before the world if he does not comply with her demands. Appalled, David complies with Joyce's demands and instructs his lawyer to give her anything she wants. There is only one more thing to be decided: custody of Martha, who is old enough to choose with which parent she will live. Looking up into her father’s eyes, Martha says quietly that she will choose the parent who needs her most—her mother.

While on a Caribbean cruise, Joyce meets Englishman Anthony Tunliffe. During a stop in Port-au-Prince, the two visit the now-divorced, disillusioned and alcoholic Emily living with a gigolo, and she expresses concern for Joyce's future. When Joyce learns Anthony is married and looking for nothing more than an extramarital affair, she leaves the ship and returns home.

At Martha and Phil's wedding, Joyce and David meet, but they sit at opposite ends of the table. All the friends and family go to the airport to see them off. Joyce leans against a railing, out of sight, weeping uncontrollably. David offers to put her in a taxi, and when he asks if she wants him to ride with her, she nods, speechless. In the cab, she recovers enough to tell him that she is crying not for Martha but for herself. She knows about loneliness now. She had not known how much a part of him she was. He walks her to the front door, where he suggests they start anew. He wants her back. She tells him that she has never wanted anything so much as to have him with her tonight, but she owes him something. Be sure he’s not saying this because he pities her. He moves to kiss her, but Joyce pulls back.  She asks him not to decide tonight. But if he wants her back tomorrow, or the day after, or anytime, she’ll be waiting. She goes in and David walks away, smiling.

Cast
 Bette Davis as Joyce Ramsey
 Barry Sullivan as David Ramsey
 Jane Cowl as Emily Hedges
 Kent Taylor as Robert Townsend
 Betty Lynn as Martha Ramsey
 John Sutton as Anthony Tunliffe
 Frances Dee as Eileen Benson
 Peggie Castle as Diana Ramsey
 Otto Kruger as Ted Prescott
 Walter Sande as Swanson
 Brett King as Phil Polanski
 Richard Anderson as Jim Boland
 Natalie Schafer as Mrs. Edna Blanton
 Katherine Emery as Mrs. Gates
 Lisa Golm as Molly
 Harry Tenbrook as Taxi Driver (uncredited)

Production notes
The film's original title was The Story of a Divorce. It was made in 1949 but was not released until two years later, following the success of All About Eve.

The original script left no doubt about the couple's future. The final scene depicted a reunited Joyce and David at the breakfast table, with the woman engaging in her familiar social-climbing talk. It was clear she was still an overly ambitious wife determined to dominate her husband and steer his career path. RKO executive Howard Hughes, unhappy with the ending and the title, called the director and the two leads into the studio only two days before the film was scheduled to open at Radio City Music Hall in New York City and had them shoot his revision to the script, which he had rechristened Payment on Demand. The scene was processed, spliced into the final reel, and shipped on a Hughes-owned TWA aircraft, arriving at the theatre after the film already had begun under its original title. The projectionist had just enough time to thread his machine with the new final reel. Bette Davis later said, "The new ending broke our hearts. The one we had shot was the true ending for our film. We also were brokenhearted over the title change."

Critical reception
In his review in The New York Times, Bosley Crowther said, "Miss Davis performs most capably, achieving a surface appearance of feminine churlishness that might almost be real. Likewise, the luscious surroundings in which RKO has arranged for her to perform have, at least, the beguiling intimations of unlimited wealth and taste. But, unfortunately, the script by Bruce Manning and Curtis Bernhardt includes everything but a simple and convincing demonstration of the reasons why a marriage hasn't clicked . . . this domestic drama, which Mr. Bernhardt has staged, is entirely a vehicle for Miss Davis to pull with a firm theatrical grip across the screen."

Variety said the film "makes a point of avoiding the pitfalls of soap opera fiction in which emotional and physical crises are developed in rapid succession.
Bette Davis is in top form. Her interpretation . . . has great believability . . . Barry Sullivan handles [his role] neatly and with a quiet dignity."

TV Guide rates it three out of a possible four stars and adds, "Bypassing all the usual soapy stuff, this film offers an adult look at some of the reasons why people part company . . . An honest story with good acting and direction, [it] moves over familiar ground, but laughs are in very short supply here and would have helped considerably."

See also
 List of American films of 1951

References

External links
 
 
 
 

1951 films
1951 drama films
Films set in San Francisco
American black-and-white films
Films scored by Victor Young
Films directed by Curtis Bernhardt
American drama films
RKO Pictures films
1950s English-language films
1950s American films